Gary Lawrence Brackett (born May 23, 1980) is a former American football linebacker in the National Football League (NFL). He played college football at Rutgers, and signed with the Indianapolis Colts as an undrafted free agent in 2003. Brackett played for the Colts for his entire 9-year career, and won Super Bowl XLI over the Chicago Bears.

Early years
Brackett attended Glassboro High School in Glassboro, New Jersey. He was a two-time All-South Jersey selection, a two-time All-Group I choice, and a two-time All-Tri-County Conference choice.

College career
Brackett was a walk-on to the Rutgers University football team. By his senior year, he was captain of the defensive team and won the team's defensive MVP honors.

Professional career
On April 27, 2003, the Indianapolis Colts signed Brackett as an undrafted free agent after he was not selected in the 2003 NFL Draft.

Brackett competed for a roster spot as a backup linebacker and special teams player during training camp in 2003. He impressed the coaching staff with his ability covering kickoffs. He made his professional regular season debut during the Indianapolis Colts' season-opener at the Cleveland Browns. He finished their 9-6 loss with one solo tackle. On October 26, 2003, Brackett collected a season-high six combined tackles (five solo) during a 30-21 victory against the Houston Texans in Week 8. In Week 12, Brackett made three solo tackles and made his first career sack as the Colts defeated the Buffalo Bills 17-14. He sacked Bills' quarterback Drew Bledsoe for a nine-yard loss during the second quarter.

That year, he had 127 tackles, three interceptions and a sack. In 2006, he was named defensive captain of the Colts and had 120 tackles. He started for the Colts in their Super Bowl XLI win over the Chicago Bears. In 2007 Brackett recorded 116 tackles and four interceptions. He recorded 99 tackles in both 2008 and 2009. He started for the Colts in their Super Bowl XLIV loss to the New Orleans Saints. He was released following the 2011 season on March 9, 2012. And after the Colts released Brackett, he quickly announced his retirement from the NFL.

During his career, Brackett was twice named AFC Defensive Player-of-the-Week.

Life after the NFL
Brackett earned a Master of Business Administration degree after retirement and opened a series of restaurants in Indianapolis, including CharBlue downtown.

Personal

During a 17-month span, starting in 2003, Brackett lost his mother, father, and brother.

In 2009 Brackett was the 11th annual recipient of the Arthur S. Arkush Humanitarian Award, presented to an NFL player "whose contributions to the community and charitable organizations are especially outstanding." He won the award for his work with the IMPACT Foundation, a charity he founded in the spring of 2007.

In 2011, Brackett published Winning: From Walk-On to Captain, In Football and Life, a memoir about his life, including his accomplishments and struggles with family, college, and the NFL.

Gary and his wife Ragan have three children: Gabrielle, Gary Jr., and, Georgia Reese

References

External links

 

1980 births
Living people
American football linebackers
American restaurateurs
Rutgers Scarlet Knights football players
Indianapolis Colts players
Glassboro High School alumni
People from Glassboro, New Jersey
Players of American football from New Jersey
African-American players of American football
21st-century African-American sportspeople
20th-century African-American people
Ed Block Courage Award recipients